Chris Williams is an American actor, voice actor and comedian known for his role in Dodgeball: A True Underdog Story. He also starred as "Eddie" on the CBS series The Great Indoors.

Career
Williams has appeared on numerous television shows including CSI, JAG, The Shield, Weeds, Reno 911!, Californication, and popularly as fictional rap artist Krazee-Eyez Killa on Curb Your Enthusiasm. In 2007, he guest starred on Monk in the episode "Mr. Monk and the Really, Really Dead Guy". On February 3, 2010, he made an appearance on his older sister Vanessa Williams' series Ugly Betty as Wilhelldiva Hater, a female impersonator of her character. In 2012, he was featured in an Apple commercial. In 2016, he began starring as the bodyguard of tech billionaire Gavin Belson on the HBO comedy series Silicon Valley.

Personal life
Williams was raised Roman Catholic and is a graduate of Georgetown University. He is the great-great-grandson of Republican politician William A. Feilds,
a former slave who became an African-American legislator in the Tennessee House of Representatives. He is of African-American, English, Welsh, Irish, Finnish, Italian, and Portuguese descent.

Filmography

Film

Television

Video games

References

External links

Living people
American male film actors
American male voice actors
Georgetown University alumni
African-American male actors
African-American Catholics
American people of English descent
American people of Welsh descent
American people of Irish descent
American people of Finnish descent
American people of Italian descent
American people of Portuguese descent
American male television actors
Vanessa Williams
Year of birth missing (living people)